Mary Larine Perera (1944-2016) is a Sri Lankan politician and a former member of the Parliament of Sri Lanka and Minister of the Wayamba Provincial Council. She was married to former minister Festus Perera and Niroshan Perera is her son.

References

2016 deaths
Members of the 12th Parliament of Sri Lanka
Members of the 13th Parliament of Sri Lanka
United National Party politicians
Women legislators in Sri Lanka
21st-century Sri Lankan women politicians
1944 births